Joe Thomas (August 2, 1890 – December 28, 1965) was an American racecar driver. He was born in Seattle, Washington, and died in Sacramento, California, aged 75. Thomas started his professional racing career as a mechanician for Eddie Pullen in 1913.

Indy 500 results

References

1890 births
1965 deaths
Racing drivers from California
Indianapolis 500 drivers
Racing drivers from Seattle
AAA Championship Car drivers